WCEM (1240 AM) is a radio station broadcasting a sports format and is an affiliate of CBS Sports Radio. The station is licensed to Cambridge, Maryland, United States and owned by the Draper Holdings Business Trust. WCEM is a sister station to CBS/Fox affiliate WBOC-TV (channel 16), NBC affiliate WRDE-LD (channel 31), Telemundo affiliate WBOC-LD (channel 42), and sister radio stations WBOC-FM, WCEM-FM, WAAI, and WTDK.

History

WCEM originally signed on the air on November 11, 1947.  Its original call letters were WCMD and was known as "The Voice of the Shoremen".  The station was previously owned by MTS Broadcasting Stations before being bought by Draper in 2018.  It formerly broadcast nostalgic standards and talk radio before switching to the sports radio format in February 2019.  Under the sports radio format the station broadcasts Baltimore Orioles games, Baltimore Ravens games, University of Maryland football and basketball games, local high school football games, and the powerboat races on the Choptank River.

References

External links

CEM
Sports radio stations in the United States
Radio stations established in 1947
Cambridge, Maryland
1947 establishments in Maryland